Gajju Khan Medical College Swabi or GKMCS is a public medical institution located in Swabi District, Khyber Pakhtunkhwa, Pakistan. The college is named after the 16th-century Pashtun revolutionary leader, Gaju Khan Baba.

Departments
There are total 23 department in the Gajju Khan Medical College Swabi.

Basic Sciences 
 Department of Anotomy
 Department of Bio-Chemistry
 Department of Community Medicine
 Department of Forensic Medicine
 Department of Pathology
 Department of Pharmacology
 Department of Physiology

Clinical Sciences 
 Department of Cardiology
 Department of Dermatology
 Department of ENT
 Department of Gynecology
 Department of Medicine
 Department of Ophthalmology
 Department of Orthopedics
 Department of Pediatrics
 Department of Pediatrics surgery
 Department of Plastic Surgery
 Department of Psychiatry
 Department of Pulmonology
 Department of Radiology
 Department of Surgery
 Department of Urology
 Department of NeuroSurgery

External links

References 

Public universities and colleges in Khyber Pakhtunkhwa
Khyber Medical University
Medical colleges in Khyber Pakhtunkhwa
2014 establishments in Pakistan
Educational institutions established in 2014
Swabi District
Universities and colleges in Swabi District